Srikanth Bolla is an Indian industrialist and the founder of Bollant Industries. He is the first international blind student in Management Science at Massachusetts Institute of Technology.

Early life and education 
Bolla was born visually impaired at childbirth in Seetharamapuram of Machilipatnam, a city in Andhra Pradesh in 1991. His family was mainly dependent on farming After his matriculation, he pursued science in his 12, but was not permitted to do so. Bolla filed a case, and after a six-month wait, he was allowed to pursue science at his own risk. Bolla topped his class with a 98% on his XII board exams. Bolla was denied admission to coaching institutes for Indian Institute of Technology, where he wanted to study engineering, because he is blind. He attended Massachusetts Institute of Technology, where he was the first international blind student. He was given corporate opportunities in America, but he was looking for some innovative idea in India.

He was a youth leader since 2005 and went on to become a member of Lead India 2020: The Second National Youth Movement.  Started by former President of India Dr. A.P.J. Abdul Kalam, Lead India 2020 is helping India reach the goal of becoming a developed nation by 2020 by eradicating poverty, illiteracy and unemployment.

Career 
Bolla co-founded Samanvai Center for Children with Multiple Disabilities in 2011 in which he started a Braille printing press, providing educational, vocational, financial, rehabilitation services to students with multiple disabilities for an economically independent and self-sustainable life.

In 2012, Bolla started Bollant Industries, which manufactures areca-based products and provides employment to several hundred people with disabilities, with funding from Ratan Tata. Addressing a combination of issues – employment, economic and environment – Bollant produces eco-friendly recycled Kraft paper from municipal waste or soiled paper, packaging products from recycled paper, disposable products from natural leaf and recycled paper and recycles waste plastic in to usable products. Bollant has shown exceptional growth averaging 20% a month since inception and a turnover of ₹ 150 cr in 2018.

Srikanth is the director of Surge Impact Foundation, founded in September 2016. The organisation aims to enable individuals & institutions in India to achieve the Sustainable Development Goals by 2030.

In April 2017, Bolla was named by Forbes magazine in its list of 30 under 30 across all of Asia, one of only three Indians in that list.

Achievements 
 Distinguished Youth Service Award
 Youth Excellence Award by the Telugu Fine Arts Society of New Jersey
Entrepreneur of the Year at NDTV Indian of the Year Award 2015
Emerging Winner in SME - Pride of Telegana Awards 2018
Business Line Young Change Maker Award 2018
Emerging Leadership Award by ECLIF Malaysia - 2016
Emerging Entrepreneur of the Year by CII - 2016
2nd Place at the 93rd India Science Congress
Entrepreneur of the Year by One Young World - 2019
Nava Nakshatra Sanmanam Award by TV9 - 2019
Young Global Leaders 2021

In Popular Culture 
In 2022, a biopic Sri featuring Rajkummar Rao in the role of Srikanth Bolla was announced.

References 

Indian industrialists
Living people
Indian blind people
1991 births